The 2011 Nigerian Senate election in Delta State was held on 9 April 2011, to elect members of the Nigerian Senate to represent Delta State. Ifeanyi Okowa representing Delta North and James Manager representing Delta South won on the platform of Peoples Democratic Party, while Akpor Pius Ewherido representing Delta Central won on the platform of Democratic People's Party.

Overview

Summary

Results

Delta North 
Peoples Democratic Party candidate Ifeanyi Okowa won the election, defeating other party candidates.

Delta South 
Peoples Democratic Party candidate James Manager won the election, defeating other party candidates.

Delta Central 
Democratic People's Party candidate Akpor Pius Ewherido won the election, defeating other party candidates.

References 

Delta State senatorial elections
Delta State senatorial elections
Delta State Senate elections